Göring, also spelled Goering, is a German surname (not to be confused with the English surname Goring). Notable people with this surname include the following:
 Hermann Göring (1893–1946), a leading member of the Nazi Party
 Albert Göring (1895–1966), German businessman, brother of Hermann Göring
 Carin Göring (1888–1931), Swedish first wife of Hermann Göring
 Edda Göring (1938–2018), daughter of Hermann Göring
 Emmy Göring (1893–1973), German actress and second wife of Hermann Göring
 Heinrich Ernst Göring (1839–1913), German jurist, colonial governor of German South-West Africa, father of Hermann Göring
 Carl Göring (1841–1879), German master of chess and philosopher
 Franz Göring (born 1984), German cross country skier
 Kathrin Göring, German opera singer
 Matthias Göring (1879–1945), founder of the International General Medical Society for Psychotherapy

See also
 (1887–1938), German playwright (see also Das Opfer (Zillig))

German-language surnames
Surnames from given names